The  Fryderyk Chopin Institute is a Polish organization dedicated to researching and promoting the life and works of Polish composer Frédéric Chopin. It was created in 2001 as the result of legislation in the Polish Parliament and is under direct control of the Ministry of Culture and National Heritage. Its headquarters are located in Warsaw.

Activities 
The activities of the institute include publications, organization of concerts, conserving the physical and artistic Chopin heritage, monitoring the commercial use of Chopin's name and operating a Chopin Information Centre (the institute's website). Amongst its publication projects is a complete facsimile edition of Chopin's works, compiled from all available holograph manuscripts, edited by Zofia Chechlińska.

The institute operates the Fryderyk Chopin Museum and the five-yearly International Chopin Piano Competition. It also runs the "Young Talents" programme to encourage young Polish pianists.

The institute has also been organizing a festival Chopin and his Europe since 2005. It presents European music in the context of its links with the life and work of Chopin. One of the objectives of the festival programme is historical performance – presenting works as they were originally heard, on period instruments. The festival is organised in collaboration with the Warsaw Philharmonic, the Grand Theatre and Polskie Radio Program II.

Chopin competition 

The International Chopin Piano Competition, a piano competition held in Warsaw, Poland, has been held since 1927. Since 2010, it has been hosted by the Chopin Institute, having previously been organized by the Ministry of Culture (until 1960) and then the Chopin Society (from 1960 to 2005)

In 2018, the institute organized the inaugural I International Chopin Competition on Period Instruments.

Chopin museum 

The Fryderyk Chopin Museum in Warsaw was established in 1954. Since 2005, it has been operated by the Fryderyk Chopin Institute.

References

External links 
 Historical Pianos in the custody of the Fryderyk Chopin Institute
Virtual tour of the Fryderyk Chopin Institute provided by Google Arts & Culture

Frédéric Chopin
2001 establishments in Poland
Arts organisations based in Poland
Organisations based in Warsaw
International Chopin Piano Competition
Arts organizations established in 2001